Samuel Howard may refer to:
Samuel Howard (bishop), born 1951, Episcopal bishop
Samuel L. Howard, US Marine Corps general
Samuel Howard (soccer), born 1992, American soccer player
Samuel Howard (surgeon), English surgeon